Midnight Cowboy is a 1969 American film.

Midnight Cowboy may also refer to:

 Midnight Cowboy (novel), a 1965 novel by James Leo Herlihy; basis for the film
 Midnight Cowboy Radio Network, now Red Eye Radio, an American syndicated talk radio program
 Midnight Cowboy, a 2006 play by Tim Fountain, adapted from the film
 "Midnight Cowboy", a 1969 instrumental song composed by John Barry
 "Midnight Cowboy", an instrumental cover of the film theme by Faith No More, on their 1992 album Angel Dust
 "Midnight Cowboy", a story in the comics series Hellboy: Weird Tales
 "Midnight Cowboy", a chapter of the manga series Cowboy Bebop: Shooting Star
 "Midnight cowboy", one of the personnel in a 3-day shift plan in the U.S. Navy 
 "Midnight Cowboys", an episode of the TV series Fudge